Alfredo Comminetti (16 October 1895 – 26 October 1981) was an Italian racing cyclist. He rode in the 1925 Tour de France.

References

1895 births
1981 deaths
Italian male cyclists
Place of birth missing